The  Asian Men's Volleyball Championship was the fifteenth staging of the Asian Men's Volleyball Championship, a biennial international volleyball tournament organised by the Asian Volleyball Confederation (AVC) with Philippine Volleyball Federation (PVF). The tournament was held in Manila, Philippines from 27 September to 5 October 2009.

Venues

Pools composition
The teams are seeded by addition of ranking of 2007 Asian Men's Volleyball Championship and FIVB World Rankings divided by 2.

* Withdrew

Preliminary round
 All times are Philippine Standard Time (UTC+8:00).

Pool A

|}

|}

Pool B

|}

|}

Pool C

|}

|}

Pool D

|}

|}

Classification round
 All times are Philippine Standard Time (UTC+8:00).
 The results and the points of the matches between the same teams that were already played during the preliminary round shall be taken into account for the classification round.

Pool E

|}

|}

Pool F

|}

|}

Pool G

|}

|}

Pool H

|}

|}

Classification 17th–18th
|}

Classification 13th–16th

13th–16th Semifinals
|}

15th place
|}

1.Sri Lanka forfeited the match on 5 October giving Philippines a 3–0 win.

13th place
|}

Classification 9th–12th

9th–12th Semifinals
|}

11th place
|}

9th place
|}

Classification 5th–8th

5th–8th Semifinals
|}

7th place
|}

5th place
|}

Final round

Semifinals
|}

3rd place
|}

Final
|}

Final standing

Awards
MVP:  Tatsuya Fukuzawa
Best Scorer:  Kim Yo-han
Best Spiker:  Andri Widiatmoko
Best Blocker:  Mohammad Mousavi
Best Server:  Kim Yo-han
Best Setter:  Han Sun-soo
Best Receiver:  Yeo Oh-hyun
Best Libero:  Yeo Oh-hyun
Most Popular Player:  Saeid Marouf

External links
Official Website

V
A
Asian men's volleyball championships
V